Super Bowl XXXIX was an American football game played between the American Football Conference (AFC) champion New England Patriots and the National Football Conference (NFC) champion Philadelphia Eagles to decide the National Football League (NFL) champion for the 2004 season. The Patriots defeated the Eagles by the score of 24–21. The game was played on February 6, 2005, at Alltel Stadium in Jacksonville, Florida, the first time the Super Bowl was played in that city.

The Patriots, who entered the Super Bowl after compiling a 14–2 regular season record, became the most recent team to win consecutive Super Bowls. New England also became the second team after the Dallas Cowboys to win three Super Bowls in four years, cementing their status as the NFL dynasty of the 2000s. The Eagles were making their second Super Bowl appearance since 1981 after posting a 13–3 regular season record. Nearly 13 years later, the two exact teams would meet again in Super Bowl LII with the Eagles defeating the favored Patriots.

The game was close throughout, with the teams battling to a 14–14 tie by the end of the third quarter. The Patriots then scored 10 points in the 4th quarter with Corey Dillon's 2-yard touchdown run and Adam Vinatieri's 22-yard field goal. The Eagles then cut their deficit to 24–21, with quarterback Donovan McNabb's 30-yard touchdown pass to receiver Greg Lewis, with 1:48 remaining in the game but could not sustain the comeback. Overall, New England forced four turnovers, while Patriots wide receiver Deion Branch was named Super Bowl MVP for recording 133 receiving yards and tied the Super Bowl record with 11 catches.

To avoid the possibility of an incident similar to the Super Bowl XXXVIII halftime show the previous year, the league selected Paul McCartney as a "safe" choice to perform during Super Bowl XXXIX's halftime. The broadcast of the game on Fox was watched by an estimated 86 million viewers.

Background

NFL owners voted to award Super Bowl XXXIX to Jacksonville during their November 1, 2000 meeting held in Atlanta.

Patriots seek to become a dynasty

New England finished the regular season with a record of 14–2, bested only by the Steelers' 15–1 mark, and ranking 7th in yards gained (5,773) and fourth in points scored (437).

The Patriots' major acquisition prior to the season was veteran running back Corey Dillon, who joined the team after playing 7 seasons with the Cincinnati Bengals. In his first 6 seasons in the league, Dillon averaged over 1,250 rushing yards per year, including setting a single-game rushing record (278 yards, but has since been broken) against the Denver Broncos on October 22, 2000. In 2003, however, injuries, conflicts with the Bengals' management and coaching staff, and other off-field problems limited him to just 541 yards during the season. By the end of the 2003 season, Dillon had lost his starting job to running back Rudi Johnson, and thus demanded to be traded. Although many observers questioned how effective the 30-year-old Dillon would be after recovering from his injuries as well as his ability to function in a team environment, the Patriots decided to sign the running back in exchange for a second-round draft pick.

Dillon became a significant offensive weapon for the 2004 Patriots, recording 1,635 rushing yards (franchise record) and 12 touchdowns, both career highs, and was named to the Pro Bowl for the fourth time in his career. He also caught 15 passes for 103 yards and another touchdown.  His contributions helped lead the team to break the NFL record for the most consecutive regular season victories (18), the record for the most consecutive overall victories (21) and earned the second best regular season record during the year at 14–2. The team's only losses during the year were to the Pittsburgh Steelers, who ended up with the league's best regular season record at 15–1, and a 29–28 loss to the Miami Dolphins on ABC's Monday Night Football.

Another weapon in the Patriots' offensive backfield was running back Kevin Faulk, who rushed for 255 yards, recorded 26 receptions for 248 yards, returned 20 punts for 113 yards, returned 4 kickoffs for 73 yards, and scored 3 total touchdowns.  Fullback Patrick Pass also emerged as a big contributor, rushing for 141 yards, catching 28 passes for 215 yards, and gaining another 115 yards on kickoff returns.

Pro Bowl quarterback Tom Brady remained at the helm of the Patriots offense, completing 288 out of 474 (60.8 percent) of his passes for 3,692 yards, 28 touchdowns, and 14 interceptions. Although wide receiver Deion Branch, New England's major deep threat, missed most of the season because of injuries, he did record 35 receptions for 454 yards and 4 touchdowns. Wide receiver David Givens ended up being the team's leading receiver with 56 catches for 874 yards and 3 touchdowns. Wide receiver David Patten also contributed with 44 receptions for 800 yards and 7 touchdowns, and tight end Daniel Graham had 30 receptions for 364 yards and 7 touchdowns.  On special teams, pro bowl kicker Adam Vinatieri had the best season of his career, leading the NFL in field goals made (31), field goal percentage (93.9) and scoring (141 points)

On defense, the Patriots were plagued by injuries, especially in their secondary. Defensive backs Tyrone Poole and Ty Law suffered season-ending injuries, while safety Eugene Wilson, who led the team with 4 interceptions, missed several games. In order to compensate for the losses, the following players were promoted to starters:
Rookie cornerback Randall Gay, who did not play at all in the first 3 games of the season, and did not start until the 6th week.
Cornerback Asante Samuel, who normally only played in dime formations.
Safety Earthwind Moreland, who came off of the team's practice squad and had only played in three games in his entire 5-year NFL career.
Veteran wide receiver Troy Brown. Head Coach Bill Belichick used Brown in the secondary during training camp, gave him playing time there during the preseason and saw Brown did very well.

With their patchwork secondary, the Patriots ranked just 17th in passing yards allowed (3,400) and 22nd in completions allowed (315). However, they did rank 7th in interceptions (20) and 10th in fewest passing touchdowns allowed (18). Most importantly, New England continued to win despite the injuries. Brown actually turned out to be very effective playing as a defensive back, ranking second on the team with 3 interceptions. Safety Rodney Harrison was also an impact player, leading the team with 138 tackles while also recording 3 sacks and 2 interceptions.

Up front, the Patriots' defensive line was anchored by Pro Bowler Richard Seymour, who recorded 5 sacks and 1 fumble recovery. New England also still had their trio of impact veteran linebackers: Pro Bowler Tedy Bruschi (122 tackles, 3.5 sacks, 3 interceptions, and 70 return yards), Willie McGinest (9.5 sacks, 1 fumble recovery, and 1 interception), and Mike Vrabel (71 tackles and 5.5 sacks), along with Ted Johnson. Vrabel also frequently played at the tight end position during offensive plays near the opponent's goal line, recording 2 touchdown receptions.

Eagles return to the Super Bowl

The Eagles gained the 2004 NFC Super Bowl berth after 3 consecutive defeats in the NFC Championship Game to the St. Louis Rams, Tampa Bay Buccaneers (who won Super Bowl XXXVII that year), and Carolina Panthers, respectively. The Eagles hired Andy Reid as their head coach in 1999 following two straight losing seasons. That same year, they used their first-round pick in the NFL draft (the second overall) to select quarterback Donovan McNabb. Although they finished the 1999 regular season with a 5–11 record, they became a playoff team in 2000, with McNabb throwing for 3,365 yards and 21 touchdowns while also rushing for 629 yards and another 6 touchdowns.

The Eagles achieved the best regular season record in the conference during the combined 2001, 2002, and 2003 seasons with a total of 35 wins out of 48 games, but lost the NFC Championship Game in each of those 3 years. Prior to the 2004 season, the Eagles traded for wide receiver Terrell Owens to be the impact player to help get them to the Super Bowl.

Owens joined the team after 8 seasons with the San Francisco 49ers. He was considered one of the top receivers in the league, but he was also widely considered a troublemaker because of controversial touchdown celebrations and his tendency to berate his teammates during media interviews. Nevertheless, Owens became the Eagles' deep-ball threat, finishing the season with 77 receptions for 1,200 yards and 14 touchdowns.

McNabb had the best season of his career in 2004, completing 300 out of 469 (64 percent) passes for 3,875 yards, 31 touchdowns, and 8 interceptions, making him the first quarterback to ever throw for more than 30 touchdowns and fewer than 10 interceptions in a season. He also rushed for 220 yards and 3 touchdowns. Wide receiver Todd Pinkston was also a reliable target, recording 36 catches for 676 yards.

Philadelphia's running game was not as strong as their passing attack, ranking just 24th in the league in rushing yards (1,639).  Running back Brian Westbrook led the team with 812 rushing yards and 3 touchdowns, however he also led all NFL running backs in receiving with 73 receptions for 706 yards and 6 touchdowns. Veteran running back Dorsey Levens was also a big contributor with 410 rushing yards. The Eagles' offensive line was led by Pro Bowl tackles Tra Thomas and Jon Runyan and center Hank Fraley.

Three of their four starters in the defensive secondary were named to the Pro Bowl: Cornerback Lito Sheppard (1 sack, 5 interceptions, 172 return yards and 2 touchdowns), safety Michael Lewis (88 tackles, 2 forced fumbles, 1 sack, and 1 interception) and safety Brian Dawkins (3 sacks, 2 forced fumbles, 1 fumble recovery, and 4 interceptions for 40 return yards), while their fourth starter, cornerback Sheldon Brown, also enjoyed a solid year (89 tackles, 3 sacks, 1 forced fumble, and 2 interceptions). Their defensive line was anchored by Pro Bowl defensive tackle Corey Simon (5.5 sacks) and defensive ends Jevon Kearse (7.5 sacks, Pro Bowl) and Derrick Burgess. Pro Bowl middle linebacker Jeremiah Trotter, who only started 9 games, recorded 69 tackles and 1 sack.

The Eagles started the 2004 regular season with seven straight wins before suffering a loss to the 15-1 Steelers. After that, they finished the season with a 13–3 record. Their only other 2 losses were in their last 2 games of the season, when they decided to rest all of their starters because they had already clinched the NFC #1 seed, and thus home-field advantage in the playoffs. However, during a December 19, 12–7 win over the Dallas Cowboys, Owens was seriously injured on a "horse-collar tackle" by Cowboys defensive back Roy Williams and had to miss the rest of the regular season and the playoffs.

Playoffs

Despite the loss of Owens, the Eagles beat the Minnesota Vikings, 27–14, and the Atlanta Falcons, 27–10, in the playoffs with relative ease. McNabb recorded 21 out of 33 completions for 286 yards and two touchdowns, while receiver Freddie Mitchell scored two touchdowns in the victory over the Vikings. Although Minnesota quarterback Daunte Culpepper threw for 316 yards, the Eagles defense recorded 2 interceptions, 2 sacks, and a forced fumble. McNabb then completed 17 out of 26 passes for 180 yards and two touchdowns in the win over the Falcons. The Eagles defense held dual-threat quarterback Michael Vick to only 136 passing yards, 26 rushing yards, and no touchdowns, while also recording an interception, 4 sacks, and a forced fumble on Vick. McNabb had an average passer rating of 111.3 in the two games, with 466 passing yards, 35 rushing yards, 4 touchdowns, and no turnovers. Safety Brian Dawkins was also an important player, recording a sack and a forced fumble against the Vikings, followed by an interception and a forced fumble against the Falcons in the NFC Championship Game.

Meanwhile, the Patriots defeated the Indianapolis Colts, 20–3, holding the league's highest scoring team with 522 total points to just one field goal, Indianapolis' lowest point total since their opening game of the 2003 season. Colts quarterback Peyton Manning threw for 4,557 yards during the regular season, and set NFL records for most touchdown passes in a regular season (49) and highest quarterback rating (121.4). Running back Edgerrin James gained 2,031 combined rushing and receiving yards and scored 9 touchdowns. Wide receivers Marvin Harrison, Reggie Wayne, and Brandon Stokley each recorded over 1,000 receiving yards and 10 touchdowns. However, the Patriots limited Manning to 238 passing yards with 1 interception and no touchdowns, and James to just 39 rushing yards. The Patriots also held possession of the ball for 37:43, including 21:26 in the second half, and recorded three long scoring drives that each took over 7 minutes off the clock. One reason New England was able to hold the ball so long was because of Dillon's rushing. He finished the game with 23 carries for 144 yards and 5 receptions for 17 yards.

The Patriots then defeated the first seeded Pittsburgh Steelers in the AFC Championship Game, 41–27. Although Pittsburgh had beaten New England, 34–20, during the regular season and led the league in fewest total yards allowed, they could not stop the Patriots. Brady threw for 207 yards and 2 touchdowns; Dillon rushed for 73 yards and a touchdown; and Branch, who was coming off of his injuries, recorded 4 receptions for 116 yards and a touchdown, along with 37 rushing yards and another touchdown on 2 carries. Steelers quarterback Ben Roethlisberger (who had struggled the previous week against the New York Jets) was intercepted 3 times, and running back Jerome Bettis, Pittsburgh's leading rusher, was held to just 64 yards.

Super Bowl pregame news
Owens was cleared to play in Super Bowl XXXIX, defying doctors' orders by playing on his injured ankle containing 2 screws and a metal plate.

The other major story was the Patriots' potential loss of both their offensive coordinator and defensive coordinator at the end of the season, and how it might affect the team in 2005. On December 12, 2004, about a month and a half before the game, New England offensive coordinator Charlie Weis signed a contract to become the head coach of Notre Dame starting in the 2005 season. Rumors were also circulating that defensive coordinator Romeo Crennel would also leave the team to become the head coach of the Cleveland Browns (which ended up being true as Crennel and the Browns agreed to a contract a couple of weeks after the Super Bowl).

Due to injuries at the tight end spot, the Eagles were forced to sign Jeff Thomason, a former tight end who was working construction at the time, to a one-game contract for the Super Bowl. Thomason saw time during several plays, although never had a ball thrown his way. This was his third Super Bowl, playing in two with the Green Bay Packers during Andy Reid's days as a Packer assistant.

With this appearance the Patriots became the 8th team to make it to the Super Bowl for the 5th time. They joined the Dallas Cowboys, Denver Broncos, Pittsburgh Steelers, San Francisco 49ers, Miami Dolphins, Washington Redskins, and Oakland/Los Angeles Raiders. They would be joined by the Green Bay Packers in 2011 the New York Giants in 2012 and the Kansas City Chiefs in 2023

The Eagles were trying to win their first NFL title since 1960 and the first championship for the city of Philadelphia since Moses Malone's "fo', fi', fo'" during the 76ers run to the  NBA Championship. The streak included the Eagles in Super Bowl XV in 1981. 1989 was not included in that streak, but 1977, 1981, 1985 (Flyers), 1993 (Phillies), 1997 (Flyers), and 2001 (76ers) were.

As the designated home team in the annual rotation between AFC and NFC teams, the Eagles elected to wear their home midnight green uniforms with white pants, while the Patriots wore their road white uniforms with navy pants.

Broadcasting
The game was televised in the United States by Fox, with play-by-play announcer Joe Buck and color commentators Troy Aikman and Cris Collinsworth. Pam Oliver (Patriots sideline) and Chris Myers (Eagles sideline) served as sideline reporters. At age 35, Buck was the youngest announcer to call the play-by-play of a Super Bowl telecast. This also marked the first time since Super Bowl I that none of the network commentators had ever called a Super Bowl game before (although Collinsworth had worked three prior Super Bowl telecasts as a pregame analyst). This was the last game that Collinsworth broadcast as a member of the NFL on Fox team, as he chose to return to NBC in the following off-season. 

James Brown hosted all the events with help from his fellow Fox NFL Sunday cast members Terry Bradshaw, Howie Long, and Jimmy Johnson. Jillian Barberie served as weather and entertainment reporter. This was the final Super Bowl that Brown hosted for Fox, as he would return to CBS following the 2005 season.

Following the game, Fox aired a special episode of The Simpsons ("Homer and Ned's Hail Mary Pass") and the series premiere of American Dad! ("Pilot"), except in Philadelphia and Boston, where local newscasts delayed the premieres by an hour.

Westwood One broadcast the game on radio, with Marv Albert calling the play-by-play, Boomer Esiason providing color commentary, and John Dockery and Bonnie Bernstein reporting from the sidelines. Jim Gray hosted the broadcast along with Dave Sims.

Entertainment

Pregame ceremonies
Before the game, performances came from the Black Eyed Peas, Earth Wind & Fire, Charlie Daniels, John Fogerty, and Gretchen Wilson. Shortly before kickoff, Will Smith introduced Alicia Keys who sang "America the Beautiful," paying tribute to Ray Charles, who died in June 2004. The combined choirs of the U.S. Military Academy, the U.S. Naval Academy, the U.S. Air Force Academy, and the U.S. Coast Guard Academy (including members of The Idlers) sang the national anthem accompanied by the U.S. Army Herald Trumpets. This was the first time in more than 30 years that all four service academies sang together—the last time was at the second inauguration of President Richard Nixon in 1973.

The traditional military missing man formation flyby was this year performed by a pair of F/A-18 Super Hornets from VFA-106 at NAS Oceana and a pair of the Air Force's newest fighters, the F-22 Raptor, flying from Tyndall AFB, the training base for the Raptor. The earlier military flyby during the veterans' salute was conducted by 2 T-6 Texan trainers and a B-25 Mitchell bomber.

The coin toss ceremony featured youth football players from Jacksonville: Tyler Callahan, Tyler Deal, Lawrence McCauley, and Jacob Santana; and New Orleans NFL Junior Player Development coach Tamaris Jackson.  They were billed as the first non-celebrities to participate in the coin toss.

For the third straight year, each team took the field en masse, following a tradition the Patriots had started in Super Bowl XXXVI. In prerecorded video segments, Andover, Massachusetts native Michael Chiklis introduced the Patriots, and Philadelphia-born Will Smith introduced the Eagles.

Halftime show

Paul McCartney performed during the halftime show; his selection by the NFL, the show's producers, Don Mischer Productions, and the show's sponsor, Ameriquest Mortgage, was considered to be a "safe" choice, as it avoided the possibility for an incident similar to that which sparked the Super Bowl XXXVIII halftime show controversy the previous year. McCartney's set consisted of these songs:
"Drive My Car"
"Get Back"
"Live and Let Die" from his career with Wings.
"Hey Jude"

Theme
Taking the concept a step further, for the first time, a theme was tied to the event: Building Bridges, as symbolized by the theme logo, represented by the Main Street Bridge, one of the seven bridges that crosses over the St. Johns River in the host city, and according to the League, symbolized the bridging of a nation under the NFL football umbrella. The theme was also used by Jacksonville-area nonprofit Fresh Ministries in a major event entitled "Bridges of Peace," featuring city officials asking the people to unite for the Super Bowl and heal the wounds of segregation.

Presidential appearances
Former Presidents George H. W. Bush and Bill Clinton appeared in support of their bipartisan effort to raise money for relief of the December 26, 2004 tsunami in southeast Asia through the USA Freedom Corps, an action which former President Bush described as "transcending politics."

Game summary

First quarter
On the first drive of the game, Eagles quarterback Donovan McNabb fumbled while being sacked by New England linebacker Willie McGinest, and the Patriots recovered the ball at Philadelphia's 34-yard line. Eagles' coach Andy Reid's instant replay challenge overruled the fumble; officials ruled that McNabb had been down by contact before the ball came out of his hands. Later in the quarter after each team had punted twice, McNabb completed a 30-yard pass to Terrell Owens, with a roughing the passer penalty adding 9 yards, moving the ball inside the Patriots 20-yard line. However, linebacker Mike Vrabel sacked McNabb for a 16-yard loss on the next play. On the following play, the Eagles once again appeared to turn the ball over: McNabb's pass was intercepted in the end zone by Patriots defensive back Asante Samuel, but it was nullified by an illegal contact penalty on linebacker Roman Phifer, moving the ball back inside the 20 and giving the Eagles a first down. However, McNabb's second chance was wasted as he threw an interception to safety Rodney Harrison on the next play.  This was Donovan McNabb's first red zone interception of the season.

The Eagles defense then forced New England to a three-and-out on their ensuing possession, and Philadelphia got great field position by receiving the punt at the Patriots 45-yard line. But once again, they gave up another turnover: tight end L. J. Smith lost a fumble while being tackled by defensive back Randall Gay, and Eugene Wilson recovered the ball at the 38.

Second quarter
The Eagles defense once again forced New England to punt, and got the ball back at their own 19-yard line. Aided by a pair of completions from McNabb to wide receiver Todd Pinkston for gains of 17 and 40 yards, the Eagles drove 81 yards in nine plays and scored on McNabb's six-yard touchdown pass to L. J. Smith, taking a 7–0 lead with 9:55 left in the second quarter. It was the first time New England trailed during the entire postseason. On their ensuing drive, the Patriots moved the ball to the Eagles four-yard line, mainly on plays by running back Corey Dillon, who caught two screen passes for 29 yards and rushed for 25. But quarterback Tom Brady fumbled the ball on a fake hand off Play-action pass and Philadelphia defender Darwin Walker recovered it. However, the Eagles could not take advantage of the turnover and had to punt after 3 plays. Eagles punter Dirk Johnson's punt went just 29 yards, giving the Patriots the ball at Philadelphia's 37-yard line. The Patriots then drove 37 yards to score on Brady's 4-yard pass to receiver David Givens with 1:10 remaining in the period, tying the game 7–7 by halftime. It was only the second halftime tie in Super Bowl history (Super Bowl XXIII between the 49ers and the Bengals was the other; the score at the half was 3-3) and the first time both of the game's first two quarters ended tied.

Third quarter
On the opening drive of the second half, Patriots wide receiver Deion Branch caught 4 passes for 71 yards on a drive that ended with Brady's 2-yard touchdown pass to Vrabel, who lined up at the tight end spot on the play. The Eagles later tied the game with 3:39 left in the third period with a 74-yard, 10-play drive that was capped by McNabb's 10-yard touchdown pass to running back Brian Westbrook. For the first time in Super Bowl history, the game was tied going into the fourth quarter.

Fourth quarter
Early in the final period, the Patriots put together a 9-play, 66-yard scoring drive that was keyed by 3 plays from running back Kevin Faulk, who caught 2 passes for 27 combined yards and rushed once for 12. Dillon capped off the drive with a 2-yard touchdown run to give the Patriots a 21–14 lead. Then after forcing another Eagles punt, Branch made a spectacular catch, taking the ball out of the hands of cornerback Sheldon Brown. The 19 yard gain, and a roughing-the-passer penalty on Philadelphia defensive lineman Corey Simon on the same play, set up kicker Adam Vinatieri's 22-yard field goal with 8:43 left in the game to increase the score 24–14 in favor of New England. In all three Patriots' Super Bowl wins in the decade, they held a double digit lead in the 4th quarter.

The Eagles responded with a long McNabb completion to Owens. However, after reaching the New England 36-yard line, McNabb fired a pass over the head of Dorsey Levens, where Tedy Bruschi was waiting to intercept it at the Patriots 24-yard line. At this point, there was only 7:20 to play in the game, with the Patriots still up by 10 points.

The Eagles did force New England to punt, and got the ball back at their own 21-yard line, but with 5:40 left in the game. The Eagles then drove 79 yards in 13 plays, scoring on McNabb's 30-yard touchdown pass to receiver Greg Lewis that cut their deficit to 24–21. However, the drive consumed 3:52 of the clock, and only 1:48 remained in the game by the time Lewis scored. Because of this, many sportswriters later criticized the Eagles for not immediately going to a no-huddle offense at the start of the possession. Anecdotal reports later came out alleging that McNabb was suffering from dry-heaves, and teammates Jon Ritchie and Lito Sheppard have gone on record years later that McNabb was suffering from dry-heaves or vomiting, though no video evidence exists and the stories have not been confirmed. Hank Fraley said in an interview the day after the game that McNabb was "almost puking" due to two large hits from Tedy Bruschi and Jarvis Green on back-to-back plays. McNabb himself denies that he was vomiting or dry-heaving during the final drive, and Brian Westbrook later claimed that McNabb was merely "coughing."

The Eagles failed to recover their ensuing onside kick attempt, with Christian Fauria catching the ball cleanly and sliding down to seal possession for New England. The Patriots then played it safe by running the ball 3 times and forcing Philadelphia to use all of its timeouts. New England punter Josh Miller then pinned the Eagles back at their own 4-yard line with just 46 seconds left in the game. Philadelphia then tried one last desperate drive to win or tie the game. But on first down, McNabb was pressured into making a rushed pass to Westbrook at the line of scrimmage. Instead of dropping the pass to stop the clock, Westbrook made the mistake of catching the ball and was immediately tackled for no gain, keeping the clock running and forcing the Eagles to run back to the line of scrimmage for their next play with no huddle. On second down, McNabb threw an incomplete pass intended for Owens. Finally on third down, McNabb threw a pass that deflected off of the outstretched fingertips of Smith and into the arms of Harrison for an interception with nine seconds left. Tom Brady took a knee to run out the clock, clinching the 3rd Super Bowl title in 4 years for the Patriots, and in the eyes of many establishing themselves as a dynasty.

Box score

Statistical overview

McNabb completed 30 out of 51 passes for 357 yards and 3 touchdowns, but threw 3 interceptions and was sacked four times. McNabb's 357 yards are tied with Joe Montana for the seventh most in Super Bowl history and third most of any quarterback, as Tom Brady holds both the top and number 2 spot, with 505 yards in Super Bowl LII and 468 yards in Super Bowl LI. Westbrook was the Eagles leading rusher with 44 yards, while also catching 6 passes for 70 yards and a touchdown and returning 3 punts for 19 yards. Pinkston caught 4 passes for 82 yards, while Owens was the Eagles' top receiver with 9 catches for 122 yards, however neither of them scored a touchdown.

Brady completed 23 out of 33 passes for 236 yards and 2 touchdowns. Dillon was the top rusher of the game with 75 yards and a touchdown, and had 3 catches for 31 yards. Running back Kevin Faulk contributed 38 rushing yards and 27 receiving yards.

Branch's Super Bowl record 11 catches tied Cincinnati Bengals' Dan Ross in Super Bowl XVI and San Francisco 49ers' Jerry Rice in Super Bowl XXIII.  Coincidentally, all three would later be traded to the Seattle Seahawks: Ross in 1985, Rice in 2004 and Branch in 2006.  Branch's combined 21 catches in Super Bowls XXXVIII and XXXIX are the most in back-to-back Super Bowls. Branch also became the third offensive player ever to win Super Bowl MVP honors without scoring a touchdown or throwing a touchdown pass. The other two players were Joe Namath in Super Bowl III and Fred Biletnikoff in Super Bowl XI.[5]

Branch and Terrell Owens each had 100 yards receiving, marking the third time in Super Bowl history, one player from each team had over 100 yards in a Super Bowl. Michael Irvin and Andre Reed were the first in Super Bowl XXVII, and Branch and Muhsin Muhammad the second a year earlier in Super Bowl XXXVIII. Branch also became the fourth player to have at least 100 yards receiving in back-to-back Super Bowls, joining John Stallworth, Jerry Rice and Antonio Freeman. Also, Mike Vrabel and David Givens became just the 14th and 15th players to score a touchdown in consecutive Super Bowls. Vrabel is the most surprising person on this list because he is a linebacker and he scored his on offense. They also became just the 7th and 8th players to catch a touchdown in back-to-back Super Bowls.

With the victory, Tom Brady became just the fourth quarterback to win at least three Super Bowls, along with Terry Bradshaw, Joe Montana and Troy Aikman. Brady also became the fourth quarterback to throw a touchdown pass in three different Super Bowls. Other quarterbacks to do it were Bradshaw, Montana, and John Elway, with Kurt Warner later accomplishing the feat during Super Bowl XLIII and Peyton Manning in Super Bowl XLVIII.

The Patriots joined the Dallas Cowboys as the only teams in NFL history to win three Super Bowls in a span of four years.

Eagles halfback Dorsey Levens retired immediately following this game.

Aftermath
The Patriots' Super Bowl win was the third championship for Boston-area sports teams in 12 months, following the Patriots winning Super Bowl XXXVIII the year before and the Red Sox winning the World Series – first in 86 years – three months earlier. This marked the first time since 1989–1990 in the San Francisco Bay Area that the same market has had 2 Super Bowl and World Series winners in 12 months.

The Patriots would go on to have the only 16-0 season in NFL history three years later, get to another six Super Bowls and win three of them before Tom Brady departed following the 2019 season.

With the Eagles’ loss, the city of Philadelphia’s sports championship drought continued (no Philadelphia-based pro sports team since the 1983 76ers won the NBA title) until the Phillies won the 2008 World Series. The Eagles did not return to the Super Bowl until 2017, also with a 13–3 record, when they beat the Falcons and Vikings in the reverse order that they did in the 2004–05 playoffs.  They exacted revenge on New England in Super Bowl LII, defeating them 41–33 and winning their first championship since 1960.

15 years later, Andy Reid returned to the Super Bowl as head coach of the Kansas City Chiefs, who defeated the San Francisco 49ers 31–20 at Super Bowl LIV, winning the team's first title since Super Bowl IV and Reid's first as head coach. They would return to the Super Bowl in 2021, but lose to Tom Brady's second team, the Tampa Bay Buccaneers, 31–9. They would return to the Super Bowl in 2023, and win over the Philadelphia Eagles, 38-35.

As of 2023, this is the last time that a team has won back-to-back Super Bowls.

Final statistics
Sources:  NFL.com Super Bowl XXXIX, Super Bowl XXXIX Play Finder NE, Super Bowl XXXIX Play Finder Phi

Statistical comparison

Individual statistics

1Completions/attempts
2Carries
3Long gain
4Receptions
5Times targeted

Starting lineups
Source:

Commercials
As usual, the television coverage of this year's Super Bowl was the showcase for the most expensive commercials in television—both to produce and to buy airtime (at the rate of $2.4 million US for 30 seconds).

One ad that drew the ire of many—including the NFL—was for the internet domain provider Go Daddy, which tweaked the controversial halftime of the previous year's game with a mock censorship hearing featuring a comely woman, Nikki Cappelli (played by WWE Wrestler Candice Michelle), having a "wardrobe malfunction". Fox pulled the second airing of the ad, scheduled for the two-minute warning of the fourth quarter, along with a five-second plug, and it was replaced with a promo for The Simpsons. The Scottsdale, Arizona-based World Wide Web domain registration company got a refund on the second ad.

Another popular ad was made by the NFL. It featured players who were not in the Super Bowl, headlined by Pittsburgh Steelers rookie quarterback Ben Roethlisberger being at a beach resort, depressed he did not make it in. Joe Montana comforted Roethlisberger, and soon both Montana and Roethlisberger joined many other players in different locations in an off-key yet rousing edition of "Tomorrow" from the musical Annie. The commercial ended with the tagline: "Tomorrow, we're all undefeated again." Roethlisberger went on to lead the Steelers to victory in Super Bowl XL the very next season.

The top ad, as chosen by the USA Today Super Bowl Ad Meter was for Anheuser-Busch's Bud Light featuring a timid skydiver making his first jump getting enticed with a six-pack of the product. This ad was ranked second on ADBOWL. The highest ranked commercial by ADBOWL was Anheuser-Busch's "Applause."

For the first time since the campaign started in Super Bowl XXI, no "I'm going to Disney World!" ad aired following Super Bowl XXXIX.

Player bonuses
Each member of the Patriots received a payment of $68,000 for winning the game. The Eagles each received $36,500. When adjusted for inflation, the Patriots salary was actually less than the $15,000 paid to members of the Green Bay Packers for winning Super Bowl I in 1967. That amount of money in 1967 equated to approximately $85,000 in 2005.

Officials
Referee: Terry McAulay #77 first Super Bowl
Umpire: Carl Paganelli #124 first Super Bowl
Head Linesman: Gary Slaughter #30 first Super Bowl
Line Judge: Mark Steinkerchner #84 second Super Bowl (XXXVII)
Field Judge: Tom Sifferman #118 third Super Bowl (XXXVII, XXXVIII)
Side Judge: Rick Patterson #15 second Super Bowl (XXXVII)
Back Judge: Tony Steratore #112 first Super Bowl
Alternate Referee: Ed Hochuli #85 (referee for XXXII, XXXVIII)
Alternate Umpire: Garth DeFelice #53
Alternate Field Judge: Larry Rose #128

Note: Tom Sifferman became the first, and so far only, official to work three consecutive Super Bowls.

Notes and references

External links

 Super Bowl official website

New England Patriots postseason
Philadelphia Eagles postseason
Sports competitions in Jacksonville, Florida
Super Bowl 039
2005 in American football
2004 National Football League season
2005 in sports in Florida
21st century in Jacksonville, Florida
February 2005 sports events in the United States
Tom Brady
American football in Jacksonville, Florida
Events in Jacksonville, Florida